Kristen Cherie Mann (born August 10, 1983) is an former American professional basketball player who played in the WNBA.

Childhood
Born in Lakewood, California on August 10, 1983, Mann is the daughter of Kathy Deeds and Gene Mann. She has two brothers, Mack and Guy, and one sister, Payton, all younger than her. She went to Foothill High School, playing both basketball and softball. She played first and third base for her high school softball team, and the Foothill Knights won the state and national titles in 2000. In basketball she holds 25 school records, and was a Nike All-American.

College career
Mann went to the UC Santa Barbara, alongside fellow WNBA player Lindsay Taylor, and graduated in 2005 with a degree in Women's Studies.  She played basketball all four years at UCSB, and played softball for the 2003 season.  She played first base and was a designated hitter with a batting average of .263 for the season.  Some of her college awards are being First Team All-Big West in 2003–04 & 2002–03, 2001–02 Big-West Freshman of the Year, 2004–05 John Wooden All-American, and being awarded the Kristen Lohman trophy.  The Gauchos won the Big-West tournament championship in 2002–03.  During the summer of 2003 Mann was a member of Team USA and helped win the gold medal in the inaugural FIBA World Championship for Young Women in Sibenik, Croatia.

UC Santa Barbara statistics
Source

WNBA career
Following her collegiate career, she was selected 11th overall in the 2005 WNBA Draft. In her rookie season, Mann averaged 3.0 points and 7.7 minutes per game. In 2006, Mann was inserted into the starting line-up and averaged 7.4 points, 3.4 rebounds and 2.8 assists per game.

In 2007, Mann started 17 of the Lynx 34 games and posted career highs in scoring (7.6 ppg) and rebounds (3.6 rpg). On February 6, 2008, the Atlanta Dream selected Mann in their expansion draft. She was traded to Indiana midway through the 2008 season in exchange for Alison Bales.

While a member of the Indiana Fever, she played in five games averaging just over 6 minutes player per game and averaging 0.4 points per game. After the 2008 season, Mann was signed by the Washington Mystics, who cited her "ability to stretch the defense with her three point shot, a very high basketball IQ, and a competitive work ethic" as the reasons why they had chosen to bring her on board.

Former Lynx teammates Lindsey Harding and Eshaya Murphy joined Mann for training camping prior to the 2009 season. On June 4, 2009, Mann was waived from the Mystics, but she was re-signed on June 16, 2009.

Mann signed partway through the 2010 season with the Minnesota Lynx and would play a total of five games with them to finish out the season.

WNBA career statistics

Regular season

|-
| align="left" | 2005
| align="left" | Minnesota
| 24 || 0 || 7.7 || .500 || .000 || .688 || 1.5 || 0.5 || 0.3 || 0.0 || 0.3 || 3.0
|-
| align="left" | 2006
| align="left" | Minnesota
| 33 || 33 || 27.1 || .387 || .375 || .735 || 3.4 || 2.8 || 0.6 || 0.2 || 1.5 || 7.4
|-
| align="left" | 2007
| align="left" | Minnesota
| 34 || 17 || 25.9 || .375 || .349 || .784 || 3.6 || 1.3 || 0.9 || 0.2 || 0.8 || 7.6
|-
| align="left" | 2008
| align="left" | Atlanta
| 13 || 8 || 17.2 || .409 || .500 || 1.000 || 1.5 || 1.1 || 0.6 || 0.3 || 1.1 || 3.5
|-
| align="left" | 2008
| align="left" | Indiana
| 5 || 0 || 6.2 || .250 || .000 || .000 || 0.8 || 0.2 || 0.2 || 0.2 || 0.2 || 0.4
|-
| align="left" | 2009
| align="left" | Washington
| 16 || 0 || 5.9 || .357 || .222 || 1.000 || 0.9 || 0.4 || 0.2 || 0.0 || 0.2 || 1.6
|-
| align="left" | 2010
| align="left" | Minnesota
| 5 || 0 || 3.0 || .167 || .250 || .000 || 0.0 || 0.0 || 0.0 || 0.0 || 0.0 || 0.6
|-
| align="left" | Career
| align="left" | 6 years, 4 teams
| 130 || 58 || 17.9 || .390 || .339 || .763 || 2.4 || 1.3 || 0.5 || 0.2 || 0.8 || 5.0

Playoffs

|-
| align="left" | 2008
| align="left" | Indiana
| 3 || 0 || 10.0 || .444 || .333 || .000 || 0.3 || 0.3 || 0.3 || 0.0 || 1.3 || 3.3
|-
| align="left" | 2009
| align="left" | Washington
| 1 || 0 || 8.0 || .500 || .500 || .000 || 1.0 || 0.0 || 0.0 || 0.0 || 1.0 || 3.0
|-
| align="left" | Career
| align="left" | 2 years, 2 teams
| 4 || 0 || 9.5 || .455 || .375 || .000 || 0.5 || 0.3 || 0.3 || 0.0 || 1.3 || 3.3

Overseas career

Music career

She is also a singer/songwriter and has released recordings with Gabriel Mann, no relation, but was a college friend under the band name Sapphica. She plays the acoustic guitar and sings for the duo. She has also released music as a solo artist under her name, Kristen Mann.

References

External links 
Music Website
Sapphica Website
WNBA Player Profile
WNBA article: “Working Out with Kristen Mann”
WNBA 2005 Rookie Prospect Profile
Atlanta expansion draft results/analysis
Fever trades Bales for Mann
 LFB Player Profile (French championship)
UCSB bio

1983 births
Living people
American expatriate basketball people in France
American expatriate basketball people in Latvia
American expatriate basketball people in Turkey
American women's basketball players
Atlanta Dream players
Basketball players from California
Indiana Fever players
Minnesota Lynx draft picks
Minnesota Lynx players
People from Lakewood, California
Small forwards
Tarbes Gespe Bigorre players
UC Santa Barbara Gauchos women's basketball players
Washington Mystics players